The London Borough of Hounslow is a London borough in West London, England, forming part of Outer London. It was created in 1965 when three smaller borough councils (forming part of the former Middlesex County Council area) amalgamated under the London Government Act 1963. It is governed by Hounslow London Borough Council.

The borough stretches from near Central London in the east (Chiswick) to the border with Surrey in the west (Feltham and Bedfont), covering five major towns: Chiswick (W4), Brentford (TW8), Isleworth (TW7), Hounslow (TW3, TW4, TW5) and Feltham (TW13, TW14); it borders the boroughs of Richmond upon Thames, Hammersmith and Fulham, Ealing and Hillingdon, in addition to the Spelthorne district of Surrey.

The Borough is home to the London Museum of Water & Steam and the attractions of Osterley Park, Gunnersbury Park, Syon House, and Chiswick House. Moreover, landmarks straddling the border of Hounslow include; Twickenham Stadium and London Heathrow Airport in the London Boroughs of Richmond-upon-Thames and Hillingdon respectively.

Geography

List of districts in Hounslow
Main settlements (head district is located in the borough):

 Chiswick W4 (Turnham Green, Gunnersbury)
 Brentford TW8 (Gunnersbury)
 Isleworth TW7 (Osterley, Spring Grove, Old Isleworth)
 Hounslow TW3, TW4, TW5 (Lampton, Hounslow West, Heston, Cranford, North Hyde)
 Feltham TW13, TW14 (Hanworth, Bedfont)

Although the majority of these towns are situated in the borough, many smaller settlements that comprise them are located in adjacent boroughs. Approximately a third of Chiswick – north of the London Underground (District/Piccadilly line) railway line – falls within the London Borough of Ealing. A few roads in Brentford (around Claypond Hospital) and Isleworth (south of the River Crane and around Whitton) lay within the London Boroughs of Ealing and Richmond upon Thames respectively. A significant minority of Hounslow – south of the railway and southeast of Hounslow Heath – fall within the London Borough of Richmond upon Thames, whilst some of Hounslow – west of the River Crane – falls within the London Borough of Hillingdon. Minor parts of Feltham fall within the Borough of Spelthorne in Surrey, meaning that these parts of the town are situated outside Greater London.

Minor settlements (minor areas partly in the borough):

 Acton W3 (South Acton, Gunnersbury)
 Ealing W5 (South Ealing, Gunnersbury)
 Hammersmith W6 (Stamford Brook)
 Hanwell W7 (Boston Manor)
 Twickenham TW1 (Mogden/Ivybridge)
 Hounslow TW6 (Cranford)
 Richmond TW9 (Oliver's Island)
 Southall UB2 (North Hyde, Norwood Green)
 Hayes UB3 (North Hyde)

Settlement
The borough's area is approximately quarter parkland. Large areas of London's open space fall within its boundaries, including Chiswick House and Gardens, Gunnersbury Park, Syon Park, Osterley Park, Hounslow Heath, Avenue Park in Cranford, and Hanworth Park. The borough's predominant land use is mainly residential, with a large, commercial town centre of Hounslow. Other large town centres include Chiswick, Feltham and Brentford. Business is mainly focused on retail and aviation (due to the proximity of Heathrow Airport), especially in the west of the borough (Hounslow and Feltham). Parts of the Borough, including Chiswick, Turnham Green, Osterley and Old Isleworth are some of the most expensive parts of Outer London, with other areas such as Hounslow, Feltham and Heston being more affordable.

Attractions, parks and open spaces 

Major parks and recreational spaces include; Chiswick Gardens, Chiswick common, Turnham Green, Gunnersbury Park, Gunnersbury Triangle Nature reserve,  Carville Hall Parks, Claypond Garden, Boston Manor Park, London Playing field, Syon Park, Osterley Park, Thornbury Park, Lampton Park, Inwood Park, Heston Sports Ground, Hounslow Heath, Avenue Park, Crane Park, Letrim Park, Hanworth Park and Bedfont Lakes Country Park. Parks that are a short distance from Hounslow's border are; Ravenscourt Park (London Borough of Hammersmith and Fulham), Acton Green common, Acton Park, Ealing common, Elthorne Parkin the London Borough of Ealing, Cranford Park in the London Borough of Hillingdon, Hampton common, Fulwell Golf club, Crane Park (Whitton), Murray Park, Kew Gardens, Old Deer Park, Marble Hill Park, Richmond Park, Ham Lands, Bushy Park and Hampton Court in the London Borough of Richmond-upon-Thames.

The River Thames forms the natural boundary between Hounslow and Richmond-upon-Thames. It runs through the borough at Chiswick, Brentford and Isleworth. Various tributaries and dis tributaries of the Thames flow through the borough, including; The River Crane, River Brent/Grand Union Canal, Duke of Northumberland's River, Longford River and the Feltham Hill Brook to name a few.

Transport

Air
Hounslow abuts the perimeter of Heathrow Airport in the London Borough of Hillingdon. Plans for the expansion of Heathrow Airport are vigorously opposed by Hounslow if such plans increase or widen noise and pollution, weighed against arguments of greater employment and spending.

Bridges 
Four bridges join Hounslow to London Borough of Richmond upon Thames on the south side of the Thames:

 Barnes Railway Bridge
 Chiswick Bridge
 Kew Railway Bridge
 Kew Bridge

Previously, the Borough also encompassed part of Richmond Lock and Twickenham Bridge. This changed in 1994 when the adjacent areas surrounding these bridges were transferred to the London Borough of Richmond upon Thames.

There are several bridges crossing the River Brent, Grand Union Canal, River Crane and Duke of Northumberland's River.

River

River services between Westminster Pier and Hampton Court depart from Kew Gardens Pier just across the River Thames from Hounslow.

Road

Major roads in the Borough include:
 A4 Great West Road/Bath Road
 A205 South Circular
 A406 North Circular
 A312 The Parkway
 A316 Chiswick Lane/Great Chertsey Road
 M4

Rail and London Underground

The borough is well connected to Central London, Heathrow Airport, other London boroughs and Southeast England as a whole through various National Rail and London Underground stations. The South Western Railway serves the borough's five main towns (with additional stops at Kew Bridge and Syon Lane). London Underground District and Piccadilly lines enter the borough from Central London in the east heading either to other West and Southwest London suburbs (with the London Overground's North London Line) or towards Heathrow.

National Rail stations :

(All stations are either on the Hounslow Loop Line or Waterloo to Reading line.)
Chiswick (Zone 3)
Kew Bridge (Zone 3)
Brentford (Zone 4)
Syon Lane (Zone 4)
Isleworth (Zone 4)
Hounslow (Zone 5)
Feltham (Zone 6)
London Underground and London Overground stations :

District Line (Ealing and Richmond branches) and Piccadilly Line (Heathrow and Uxbridge branches)
Stamford Brook  (Zone 2)
Turnham Green  (Zone 2/3) - only served by the Piccadilly Line early mornings and late evenings
District Line (Ealing branch) and Piccadilly Line (Heathrow and Uxbridge branches):
Chiswick Park  (Zone 3)*
Acton Town  (Zone 3)*
District Line and North London Line (Richmond branch):
Gunnersbury  (Zone 3)
Piccadilly line (Heathrow Branch):
Boston Manor  (Zone 4)
Osterley  (Zone 4)
Hounslow East  (Zone 4)
Hounslow Central  (Zone 4)
Hounslow West  (Zone 5)
Hatton Cross  (Zone 5/6)*
*Chiswick Park, Acton Town and Hatton Cross omit the borough boundaries and are in the London Boroughs of Ealing and Hillingdon.

Travel to work
In March 2011, the main forms of transport that residents used to travel to work were (of all residents aged 16–74): 
 driving a car or van, 26.7%; 
 bus, minibus or coach, 10.5%; 
 underground, metro, light rail, tram, 10.5%; 
 train, 5.5%; 
 on foot, 5.0%; 
 work mainly at or from home, 2.9%; 
 bicycle, 2.2%.

Economy 
The borough is home to the headquarters of GlaxoSmithKline and Sky plc, both based in Brentford's 'Golden Mile' stretch of the A4 Great West Road, and several supermarket outlets once known across the globe for its cluster of factories and offices, and is currently going under extensive re developments in the form of new apartment blocks and offices. Fuller's Griffin Brewery is also in the borough, in Chiswick. Aston Martin were based in Feltham for several years before moving to Newport Pagnell, Buckinghamshire.

DHL Air UK has its head office in Hounslow.

Air France-KLM's head office for United Kingdom and Ireland operations, which includes facilities for Air France and KLM, is located in Plesman House in Hatton Cross in the borough. The Plesman House, outside of Terminal 4 of London Heathrow Airport, has the UK commercial team, sales team, and support team. Sega Europe has its head office in Brentford. Menzies Aviation has its head office by the airport in Feltham. JCDecaux UK has its head office in Brentford.

Before winding-up British Mediterranean Airways was headquartered at Hetherington House near London Heathrow Airport

A 2017 study by Trust for London and New Policy Institute found that pay inequality in Hounslow is the second largest of any London borough. It also found that 25% people in Hounslow live in poverty, which is slightly lower than the London-wide poverty rate of 27%.

Demography 

53.3% of the borough's population is White, 34.4% is Asian, and 6.6% is Black. The most noticeable South Asian populations in the borough are in Hounslow, Heston and Cranford, all of which also have considerable Eastern European populations. The majority of Afro-Caribbean, West African, and East African populations are situated around the Brentford, Isleworth and Feltham areas. The majority of the White British population reside in the eastern and western parts of the borough (Chiswick, Brentford, Isleworth, Osterley, Hounslow East, Hanworth, Feltham and Bedfont), with this population being most prominent in the affluent areas of Chiswick and Osterley.

In terms of religion, 42% identify themselves as Christian, 14% Muslim, 10.3% Hindu, 9% Sikh, 1.4% Buddhist and 0.3% Jewish; 18% of the population is not religious. At 9%, Hounslow has the largest proportion of Sikhs in London, and the third-highest in England after Slough and Wolverhampton.

The following table shows the ethnic group of respondents in the 2001 and 2011 census in Hounslow.

Religion

Political composition 

Elections across the London boroughs are currently held every four years. Since the Hounslow borough was formed, it has been controlled by the Labour Party on all but two elections: in 1968 the Conservatives formed a majority until they lost control to Labour in 1971, while the 2006 local elections produced a no overall control result. Although Labour was the largest party on the Council, the Conservatives formed a coalition with the six Councillors from the independent Isleworth Community Group (ICG) which administered the area until the 2010 local elections when Labour regained control.

Seat distribution as of 2022 elections:

Reflecting how votes were cast in the national elections, in separate polls held the same day, for the 2010-2014 period, the Conservatives and Labour won fifteen seats each from the Brentford and Isleworth constituency. Overall, control was held by the Council's Labour administration as 20 Labour Party Councillors and 10 Conservative Party Councillors were elected for wards in the Feltham and Heston half of the borough.

Between 1998 and 2006 Independents were elected to the London Borough of Hounslow from the area.  The first Independent Community Group (ICG) Councillor was elected in 1998 as Isleworth Community Group in Isleworth.  In 2002 three ICG Councillors were elected in Isleworth. In 2006 six ICG Councillors were elected (Syon and Isleworth wards), and former Labour Leader of the Council John Connelly was re-elected as an Independent in Hounslow Heath ward. All seven of the Independents were defeated in the local elections held on 6 May 2010 by, in their respective wards, Labour Party candidates. Since then one Conservative councillor has become an Independent and four Conservative Councillors have defected to UKIP. Since 2019, the council has been based at Hounslow House in Bath Road.

History

Etymology
The town of Hounslow, which has existed since the 13th century, is located at the centre of the Borough of Hounslow. The name Hounslow means 'Hund's mound'; the personal name Hund is followed by the Old English hlaew meaning mound or barrow. (The mound may have been his burial place.) It was recorded in the Domesday Book as Honeslaw.

Foundations
The borough was formed in 1965, under the London Government Act 1963, by the merger of the area of the Municipal Borough of Brentford and Chiswick, The Municipal Borough of Heston and Isleworth and Feltham Urban District of Middlesex.

The Borough is an outer borough of Greater London and lies on the Middlesex bank of the River Thames. It is the site of the first stop on an important coach route to Southampton, Bath, Bristol and Exeter. The A30 Great South West Road, which runs down to Penzance in Cornwall, starts in the borough. Hounslow town developed on either side of the main Great West Road (now the A3006/A4 Bath Road ) from London to the West of England, causing a large number of inns to be built to serve the travellers. A few, such as The Bell retain their names, although the buildings have largely been replaced. The Bell marks the former junction of the coaching routes of the A314 Hanworth Road, A315 Staines Road, A3005 Lampton Road and the A3006 Bath Road. Historic milestones are preserved on the Staines Road (now re-numbered as the A315 but joining the "old" A30 again just inside the borough's western boundary)

Hounslow grew rapidly in the latter half of the 20th century due to other travel, a connection to the largest of London's airports since the 1940s, Heathrow Airport which is in the Hounslow post town.  Little known is that aviation dates to the early 1900s here when one of London's earliest airfields was situated on Hounslow Heath because of the extremely flat terrain. The Great West Road, which crosses the borough from Chiswick to Heathrow, at one time served nationally and globally famous manufacturers including Firestone, Gillette and Coty. As a result, the area became known as the "Golden Mile".  A few of these factory sites remain today, such as Gillette Corner, and the Great West Road is still home to many prestigious names (see "famous companies" below), providing them with easy non-motorway access between Slough, London Heathrow Airport and Central London.

Education

Football clubs
 Brentford F.C. 
The borough of Hounslow has several Non-League football clubs:
 CB Hounslow United F.C. who play at the Osterley Sports Ground.
 Hanworth Villa F.C. who play at Rectory Meadow.
 Bedfont & Feltham F.C. who play at the Orchard in East Bedfont.
 Bedfont Sports F.C. who play at the Bedfont Sports Recreation Ground.
 Ashford Town F.C. (Middlesex) who play at The Robert Parker Stadium.
The borough is also home to Premiership Rugby side London Irish who share the Gtech Community Stadium with Brentford.

Twinning
Hounslow has a sister district agreement with Leningradsky District in Krasnodar Krai, Russia.

People from Hounslow

Ian Gillan, vocalist for Deep Purple, and formerly of Black Sabbath and Gillan, is a native of Hounslow. Alistair Overeem a UFC Champion was also born here.

Freedom of the Borough
The following people and military units have received the Freedom of the Borough of Hounslow.

Individuals
 Lance Sergeant Johnson Beharry  COG: 17 September 2014.

Military Units
 2nd Battalion the Royal Regiment of Fusiliers: 2009.
 The Royal British Legion: 12 March 2017.

See also

Hounslow local elections
The Community Group (London Borough of Hounslow)
Hounslow power station

Notes and references
Notes 

References

External links
The London Borough of Hounslow
Public Transport Guide

 
Hounslow
Hounslow
1965 establishments in the United Kingdom